Ghosts is the 14th full-length album by the German heavy metal band Rage with the Lingua Mortis Orchestra. It was released in 1999.

Track listing

Personnel

Band members
Peter "Peavy" Wagner - vocals, bass,  arrangements, producer
Sven Fischer - guitars
Spiros Efthimiadis - guitars
Chris Ephthimiadis - drums

Additional musicians
Victor Smolski - additional guitars, producer, engineer
Christian Wolff - piano, keyboards, producer, orchestral arrangements
Lingua Mortis Orchestra

Production
Charly Czajkowski - producer (additional), engineering (additional)
Hans Jörg Maucksch - mastering
Britta Kühlmann - engineering
Jörg Umbreit - engineering, mixing

References

Rage (German band) albums
1999 albums
GUN Records albums
Symphonic metal albums by German artists